The 1982 American League Championship Series was played between the Milwaukee Brewers and the California Angels from October 5 to 10, 1982. Milwaukee won the series three games to two to advance to the franchise's first World Series, where they would lose to the St. Louis Cardinals, four games to three. The 1982 ALCS was marked by a dramatic comeback by the Brewers, who lost the first two games of the series and were trailing late in the final game, and the series was the first League Championship Series where the home team won every game. 

The series was noteworthy as being the first to feature a matchup between two "expansion" teams (i.e., franchises not included among the 16 operating in the major leagues for most of the first half of the 20th century), for featuring two teams that had never before won a pennant, and for being the first time a team came from a 2–0 deficit to win the series.

This was the first ALCS not to feature the Athletics, Orioles, or Yankees.

Summary

Milwaukee Brewers vs. California Angels

Game summaries

Game 1
Tuesday, October 5, 1982, at Anaheim Stadium in Anaheim, California

The Angels jumped to a 1–0 lead in the first when Brian Downing scored an unearned run on a sacrifice fly by Don Baylor. Milwaukee came back to take a 3–1 lead with a two-run homer by Gorman Thomas in the second and a run scored by Paul Molitor on a groundout in the third. But the Angels took back the lead for good in their half of the third with a four-run rally highlighted by Baylor's two-run triple. Baylor capped off a five-RBI game with a two-run single in the fourth, and the Angels got another run in the fifth when eventual series MVP Fred Lynn homered. California starter Tommy John, who lent his name to the famous surgical procedure, settled down after the third and gave the Brewers little over the final six innings on his way to a complete-game victory.

Game 2
Wednesday, October 6, 1982, at Anaheim Stadium in Anaheim, California

California got off to a 4–0 lead in Game 2 and never looked back. The Angels got two in the second on an RBI single from Tim Foli and a squeeze bunt by Bob Boone. California's Reggie Jackson homered in the third to make it 3–0, and Boone plated the Angels' fourth run with a sacrifice fly in the fourth. The Brewers made a game of it in the fifth on Paul Molitor's two-run inside-the-park homer, but could get no closer the rest of the way against the strong pitching of Bruce Kison.  Those complete-game efforts helped produce the snappy 2:06 time of game. California was now up 2–0 in the series and needed only one more win for the franchise's first trip to the World Series.

Game 3
Friday, October 8, 1982, at County Stadium in Milwaukee, Wisconsin

The series moved to Milwaukee and produced the Brewers' first win. Milwaukee opened the scoring in the fourth with three runs on an RBI double by Cecil Cooper, who would eventually get the series-winning hit, and sacrifice flies by Gorman Thomas and Don Money. Paul Molitor got two more runs for Milwaukee with a seventh-inning homer, this one over the fence. Brewers starter Don Sutton pitched strongly for the first seven innings but tired in the eighth, yielding three runs on a Bob Boone homer and doubles by Fred Lynn and Don Baylor. Pete Ladd came out of the Milwaukee bullpen to get the final four outs for the save.

Game 4
Saturday, October 9, 1982, at County Stadium in Milwaukee, Wisconsin

The Brewers again staved off elimination and evened the series in a rather sloppy but high-scoring Game 4. The teams combined for five errors to allow three unearned runs. Milwaukee built a 6–0 lead with three-run rallies in the second and fourth. The Brewers got a lot of help from two California errors and three wild pitches by Angels starter Tommy John, who took the loss. The teams traded runs in the sixth: Fred Lynn doubled home Reggie Jackson for the Angels, and Jim Gantner singled home Mark Brouhard for the Brewers. Brouhard, who only appeared in 40 regular season games, was subbing for Ben Oglivie. Brouhard contributed 3 hits, 4 runs and 3 RBI's in this, the only postseason appearance of his career. California rallied for four runs in the eighth on a grand slam by Don Baylor to cut Milwaukee's lead to 7–5. But the Brewers bounced back with a two-run homer by Brouhard in the bottom of the inning to put the game away and level the series 2–2.

Game 5
Sunday, October 10, 1982, at County Stadium in Milwaukee, Wisconsin

Game 5 proved to be the most dramatic of the series. The Angels got a quick 1–0 lead in the first on a double by Brian Downing and a single by Fred Lynn. But Milwaukee tied the game in the bottom of the inning when Paul Molitor doubled and eventually came home on a sacrifice fly by Ted Simmons. The Angels made it 2–1 in the third on an RBI single from Fred Lynn, and stretched the lead to 3–1 in the fourth on a run-scoring single from Bob Boone. Milwaukee cut the lead to 3–2 in the bottom of the fourth on Ben Oglivie's homer. In the 5th inning, the Angels nearly threatened again, until Reggie Jackson was thrown out trying to reach third on a Fred Lynn single. The score remained unchanged until the bottom of the seventh, when disaster struck the Angels. Milwaukee loaded the bases on two singles and a walk. Cecil Cooper then cracked the series-winning hit, a two-run single that put the Brewers ahead 4–3. The Milwaukee bullpen kept the Angels off the board in the final two innings, helped by a spectacular catch by reserve outfielder Marshall Edwards, robbing Don Baylor of extra bases. The Angels threatened again in the 9th with a runner on second, and Rod Carew at the plate. Pete Ladd got Carew to ground out to Robin Yount, and the Brewers took home the franchise's first and only American League pennant and its only World Series appearance to date.

Composite box
1982 ALCS (3–2): Milwaukee Brewers over California Angels

Aftermath
1982 would not be the closest the Angels got to winning a pennant in the 1980s. In 1986, the Angels were up 3-1 in the AL Championship Series, leading 5-2 in ninth inning, and within one strike of their first-ever AL pennant. Dave Henderson of the opposing Red Sox caught hold of a Donnie Moore forkball and launched a home run into the left field seats to give the Red Sox a momentary, 6-5 lead on the top of the ninth inning. The Red Sox would go on to win the game 7-6 in eleven innings and complete the 3-1 series comeback. It would not be until 2002 when the Angels won their first pennant, on their way to their first World Series in franchise history.

On the 1986 Angels roster was Don Sutton, who was traded from Milwaukee to Oakland in 1985. He nearly retired upon being traded to Oakland, but continued pitching and was later traded to the California Angels at the 1985 trade deadline. Coming into the 1986 season, Sutton had 295 career victories. He struggled early in the season, but earned his 300th career win on June 18 that year, pitching a complete game against the Texas Rangers in which he allowed only three hits and one run while striking out Gary Ward for the final out of the game. Sutton was inducted into the National Baseball Hall of Fame in 1998.

This was the Milwaukee Brewers last and only AL pennant, as they moved to the National League in 1998. The Brewers have yet to win a pennant since moving to the NL.

References

External links
 1982 ALCS at Baseball-reference

American League Championship Series
Milwaukee Brewers postseason
California Angels postseason
American League Championship Series
American League Championship Series
American League Championship Series
20th century in Anaheim, California
1980s in Milwaukee
American League Championship Series
Baseball competitions in Anaheim, California
Baseball competitions in Milwaukee